Presidential elections were held in Mongolia on 18 May 1997. The result was a victory for Natsagiin Bagabandi, who won 62.5% of the vote. Voter turnout was 85.1%.

Results

References

Mongolia
1997 in Mongolia
Presidential elections in Mongolia